Nathan Healy (born August 13, 1990) is an American former professional basketball player. Healy played 4 seasons for the Appalachian State Mountaineers.

Professional career
Healy signed for the 2013–14 season with Polpharma Starogard Gdański. He left Poland early, in November. Healy recorded 2.3 points and 2.3 rebounds per game in 3 games for Starogard Gdański.

In November 2013, Healy signed with Aris Leeuwarden from Leeuwarden, Netherlands. Former foreign players Kinu Rochford and Greg Washington were released by Aris, so Healy was signed.

For the 2014–15 season Healy signed a one-year deal with Zalakeramia-ZTE KK in Hungary.

In April 2015, Healy signed with Basic-Fit Brussels.

References

External links
Draftexpress.com profile and statistics
Dutch Basketball League profile and statistics 
Eurobasket.com profile
Appalachian State profile

1990 births
Living people
American expatriate basketball people in Poland
American expatriate basketball people in the Netherlands
American expatriate basketball people in Hungary
American expatriate basketball people in Belgium
American men's basketball players
Appalachian State Mountaineers men's basketball players
Aris Leeuwarden players
Basketball players from North Carolina
Blair Academy alumni
Brussels Basketball players
Dutch Basketball League players
Small forwards
Sportspeople from New Bern, North Carolina
ZTE KK players